Shay Holtzman (born January 1, 1974) is an Israeli former professional footballer who played as a striker in the top level of Israeli league football for Maccabi Netanya, Maccabi Haifa, Tzafririm Holon, Hapoel Be'er Sheva, Beitar Jerusalem, Hapoel Haifa, Maccabi Petah Tikva, Ironi Rishon leZion, F.C. Ashdod and for the Israel national team. He also played for Austrian club Austria Wien for one season. He is both F.C. Ashdod's and the Israeli Premier League's record goalscorer. After retiring as a player, Holtzman worked as an assistant manager in F.C. Ashdod and Maccabi Netanya.

Career
Holtzman grew in the Maccabi Netanya youth team, and in 1990–91 season he went to the first team of the club until the 1992–93 season. In the 1993–94 season he played in Maccabi Haifa and won with the team in the Israeli Championship and the Toto Cup and took part in Maccabi Haifa's Cup Winners' Cup campaign, scoring two goals.

During the 1994–95 season he went from Maccabi Haifa to Tzafririm Holon, until the 1996–97 season when he transferred to Hapoel Be'er Sheva and won in the Israel State Cup.

In 1997–98 Holtzman went abroad to France, to Stade Rennais but during the season he went back to Israel, to Beitar Jerusalem which he won with the team in the Israeli Championship and the Toto Cup. In the beginning of 1998–99 Holtzman started in Hapoel Haifa but later in the season he went abroad again, to FK Austria Wien of Austria.

In the beginning of the 1999–2000 season Holtzman went back to his local club, Maccabi Netanya, but later he decided to leave again, to Maccabi Petah Tikva. After a year and a half in Petah Tikva, he started the 2001–02 season in Ironi Rishon leZion. That season he finished second place in the top scorers list with 17 goals. During 2002–03 he left Rishon leZion and signed with F.C. Ashdod. Holtzman finished the same season as the co-top scorer with Yaniv Abargil with 18 goals, the next season again he shared the title with Ofir Haim, and in the 2005–06 season he won again in this title but alone.

Honours

Team
 Israeli football championships: 1993–94, 1997–98
 Israel State Cup: 1997
 Toto Cup: 1997–98

Individual
 Israeli Premier League top goalscorer: 2002–03, 2003–04, 2005–06

References

External links

1974 births
Living people
Israeli Jews
Israeli footballers
Footballers from Netanya
Israel international footballers
Association football forwards
Maccabi Netanya F.C. players
Maccabi Haifa F.C. players
Hapoel Tzafririm Holon F.C. players
Hapoel Be'er Sheva F.C. players
Stade Rennais F.C. players
Beitar Jerusalem F.C. players
Hapoel Haifa F.C. players
FK Austria Wien players
Maccabi Petah Tikva F.C. players
Hapoel Rishon LeZion F.C. players
F.C. Ashdod players
Liga Leumit players
Israeli Premier League players
Ligue 1 players
Austrian Football Bundesliga players
Israeli expatriate footballers
Expatriate footballers in France
Expatriate footballers in Austria
Israeli expatriate sportspeople in France
Israeli expatriate sportspeople in Austria